"Never Let Her Slip Away" is a song written by American musician Andrew Gold, who recorded it for his third album, All This and Heaven Too (1978). The single reached number five on the UK Singles Chart and number 67 on the Billboard Hot 100 in 1978. Queen frontman Freddie Mercury contributed harmony vocals to the song, as an uncredited background singer. A 1992 cover version by British dance outfit Undercover was also an international hit.

Background
As revealed in his liner notes for All This and Heaven Too, Gold wrote "Never Let Her Slip Away" about meeting actress and Saturday Night Live alumna Laraine Newman who was his girlfriend when he composed the song. Besides Freddie Mercury's, other background vocals were provided by J. D. Souther and Timothy B. Schmit, and the saxophone was played by Ernie Watts.

In popular culture
In 1995, British comedians Vic Reeves and Bob Mortimer performed a cover of the song on their show The Smell of Reeves and Mortimer. "Never Let Her Slip Away" was also featured on the soundtrack of the film Alan Partridge: Alpha Papa (2013), as a personal favourite of the principal character.

In conversation on the podcast WTF with Marc Maron, Dave Grohl, singer, songwriter and guitarist of the renowned rock band Foo Fighters, called "Never Let Her Slip Away" "the most beautiful piece of music ever written," and "maybe one of the most melodically sophisticated songs I’ve ever heard in my entire life," and noted his plans to record a cover version of the song.

Charts

Weekly charts

Year-end charts

Undercover version

British dance group Undercover covered the song on their debut album, Check Out the Groove (1992). This version also reached number five in the United Kingdom, as Gold's original did. It additionally reached number two in Ireland, number three in Belgium, number four in Finland and number seven in the Netherlands. On the Eurochart Hot 100, the track peaked at number 11 in December 1992.

Critical reception
A reviewer from Lennox Herald picked the song as a "stand out" from the album. Pan-European magazine Music & Media commented, "Once again Undercover has hit a goldmine with a cover of a '70s singer/songwriter's work. This time it's the Andrew Gold 1978 classic. The crucial difference is that this is more beaty." Alan Jones from Music Week rated it four out of five, stating that "already achieving a surprisingly major degree of club crossover, it's very much in the KWS/East Side Beat mould, and could even reach the very summit." Mark Frith from Smash Hits also gave it four out of five, adding that "Undercover bloke John Matthews was born to make this record." He described it as a "gorgeous, poignant ballad that suits him down to the ground."

Music video
A music video was made to accompany the song. It was published on YouTube in April 2013. By November 2020, the video has been viewed over 1 million times.

Track listing
 CD single
 "Never Let Her Slip Away" (Essential Edit) – 3:28	
 "Never Let Her Slip Away" (Essential Mix) – 4:59	
 "Sha Do" (Extended Mix) – 5:41

Charts

Weekly charts

Year-end charts

References

1978 singles
1978 songs
1992 singles
Andrew Gold songs
Asylum Records singles
Pete Waterman Entertainment singles
Songs written by Andrew Gold
Undercover (dance group) songs